A metallophone is any musical instrument in which the sound-producing body is a piece of metal (other than a metal string), such as tuned metal bars, tubes, rods, bowls, or plates.  Most frequently the metal body is struck to produce sound, usually with a mallet, but may also be activated by friction, keyboard action, or other means.

Metallophones have been used in music in Asia for thousands of years. There are several different types used in Balinese and Javanese gamelan ensembles, including the gendér, gangsa and saron. These instruments have a single row of bars, tuned to the distinctive pelog or slendro scales, or a subset of them. The Western glockenspiel and vibraphone are also metallophones: they have two rows of bars, in an imitation of the piano keyboard, and are tuned to the chromatic scale.

In music of the 20th century and beyond, the word metallophone is sometimes applied specifically to a single row of metal bars suspended over a resonator box. Metallophones tuned to the diatonic scale are often used in schools; Carl Orff used diatonic metallophones in several of his pieces, including his pedagogical Schulwerk. Metallophones with microtonal tunings are used in Iannis Xenakis' Pléïades and in the music of Harry Partch.

Classification
Metallophones are a subset, made of metal, of Hornbostel-Sachs category 111.22 Percussion plaques, which is a subset of percussion idiophones.

List of metallophones

 Aluphone
 Bell
 Bell plate
 Bonang
 Celesta
 Chime bar
  Cowbells
 Crotales
 Dulcitone
 Fangxiang
 Gangsa
 Geger
 Gendér
 Glockenspiel
 Gong
 Hand bells
 Handpan
 Jegogan
 Jublag
 Kulintang a Tiniok/Sarunay
 Mark tree
 Orff metallophones
 Ranat ek lek
 Ranat thum lek
 Rhodes piano
 Roneat dek
 Roneat thong
 Saron
 Slentem
 Step bell
 Steel marimbaphone
 Ugal
 Steel drum
 Tam-tam
 Toy piano
  Triangle
 Tubaphone
 Tubular bells
 Vibraphone
 Waterphone

See also 
 Aerophone
 Lithophone
 Xylophone

External links 

Keyboard percussion instruments
Percussion idiophones